Martina Monika Willing (born 3 October 1959) is a Paralympic athlete from Germany competing in field events. She is both blind and paraplegic. Until 1994 she competed in the F11 classification for vision impaired athletes; following her paralysis, she returned to competition as a seated thrower. Willing has competed and medalled in eight Paralympic Games - all seven summer games from 1992 in Barcelona to 2016 in Rio as well as at the 1994 winter games in Lillehammer. Complications during knee surgery following a fall at the Lillehammer Paralympics led to her paralysis.

, she is world record holder in both F11 and F56 javelin, and P11 pentathlon events.

Willing won the Whang Youn Dai Achievement Award in 2000. She worked as a biologist, but has now retired.

References

External links
 
 

1959 births
Living people
German female cross-country skiers
German female javelin throwers
Paralympic athletes of Germany
Paralympic cross-country skiers of Germany
Paralympic gold medalists for Germany
Paralympic silver medalists for Germany
Paralympic bronze medalists for Germany
Paralympic medalists in athletics (track and field)
Paralympic medalists in biathlon
Paralympic medalists in cross-country skiing
World record holders in Paralympic athletics
Athletes (track and field) at the 1992 Summer Paralympics
Athletes (track and field) at the 1996 Summer Paralympics
Athletes (track and field) at the 2000 Summer Paralympics
Athletes (track and field) at the 2004 Summer Paralympics
Athletes (track and field) at the 2008 Summer Paralympics
Athletes (track and field) at the 2012 Summer Paralympics
Athletes (track and field) at the 2016 Summer Paralympics
Athletes (track and field) at the 2020 Summer Paralympics
Cross-country skiers at the 1994 Winter Paralympics
Medalists at the 1994 Winter Paralympics
Medalists at the 1992 Summer Paralympics
Medalists at the 1996 Summer Paralympics
Medalists at the 2000 Summer Paralympics
Medalists at the 2004 Summer Paralympics
Medalists at the 2008 Summer Paralympics
Medalists at the 2012 Summer Paralympics
Medalists at the 2016 Summer Paralympics
20th-century German women
21st-century German women